Sarty is a surname. Notable people with the surname include: 

Glenn Sarty (1930–2007), Canadian television producer 
Ralph Sarty, American politician
Roger Sarty (born 1952), Canadian historian

See also
 Marty (surname)
 Novyye Sarty
 Sarti